Limezh is a rural locality (a selo) in Cherdynsky District, Perm Krai, Russia. The population was 21 as of 2010. There are 2 streets.

Geography 
Limezh is located 53 km south of Cherdyn (the district's administrative centre) by road. Abog is the nearest rural locality.

References 

Rural localities in Cherdynsky District